The 2015–16 Premier League Tournament was the 28th season of first-class cricket in Sri Lanka's Premier Trophy. It was held between 4 December 2015 and 6 March 2016, with fourteen teams competing. Tamil Union Cricket and Athletic Club won the competition, their first championship since the 1950–51 season.

Teams
The following teams competed:

Group A
 Chilaw Marians Cricket Club
 Colombo Cricket Club
 Moors Sports Club
 Ragama Cricket Club
 Saracens Sports Club
 Sri Lanka Ports Authority Cricket Club
 Tamil Union Cricket and Athletic Club

Group B
 Badureliya Sports Club
 Bloomfield Cricket and Athletic Club
 Colts Cricket Club
 Galle Cricket Club
 Nondescripts Cricket Club
 Sinhalese Sports Club
 Sri Lanka Army Sports Club

Fixtures

Group A

Group B

Plate Championship

Super Eight

References

External links
 Series home at ESPN Cricinfo

Premier League Tournament
Premier League Tournament
Premier League Tournament